Sedalia station is an Amtrak train station in Sedalia, Missouri, United States. It was originally built by the Missouri Pacific Railroad.

Although constructed in 1886, the depot underwent a drastic remodeling in 1951 that sheared off the second floor, reconstructed the ground floor, added new space, and completely did away with any traces of the station's original Queen Anne design in favor of a streamlined Art Moderne aesthetic. The station closed in the 1970s and entered a period of deferred maintenance that threatened its structural integrity. In 1998, Sedalia Downtown Development, Inc (SDDI), a non-profit organization focused on downtown revitalization, began to plan for the transformation of the depot into a multi-modal transportation center. Renovations completed in 2011 created a new Amtrak waiting room and offices for SDDI and OATS, a regional public transportation service.

Sedalia was also once served by the former Missouri-Kansas-Texas Railroad depot at East 3rd Street & Thompson Avenue.  Now it is part of the Katy Trail State Park.

See also
List of Amtrak stations

References

External links

Sedalia, MO – USA Rail Guide (TrainWeb)

Amtrak stations in Missouri
Former Missouri Pacific Railroad stations
Buildings and structures in Pettis County, Missouri
1886 establishments in Missouri
Railway stations in the United States opened in 1886